Jindřich Lauterbach was a male Czech international table tennis player.

Table tennis career
He won a silver medal and bronze medal at the 1931 World Table Tennis Championships in the team event and in the men's doubles with Karel Svoboda respectively. The following year he won a gold medal in the team event at the 1932 World Table Tennis Championships for Czechoslovakia.

See also
 List of table tennis players
 List of World Table Tennis Championships medalists

References

Czech male table tennis players
World Table Tennis Championships medalists